Vrigne-aux-Bois is a commune in the Ardennes department in northern France. It is located 14 kilometers from the neighboring town of Sedan. On 1 January 2017, the former commune of Bosseval-et-Briancourt was merged into Vrigne-aux-Bois.

Population

See also
Communes of the Ardennes department

References

Communes of Ardennes (department)
Ardennes communes articles needing translation from French Wikipedia